Wayside is an unincorporated community in Monroe County in the U.S. state of West Virginia. It is located along County Route 7 near its juncture with County Route 9. Wayside is the birthplace of Ettie Mae Greene, the oldest person ever in that state.

References

Unincorporated communities in Monroe County, West Virginia
Unincorporated communities in West Virginia